Ganotantrik Biplobi Jote (Democratic Revolutionary Unity) is the mass front of BSD-ML. GBJ was founded in 1987.

The students' wing of GBJ is Bangladesh Students Federation.

GBJ publishes Sanskriti (Cultural), Janojug (People's Era), and Trinamul (Grassroot).

References 

Communist parties in Bangladesh
Political parties established in 1987